The state of Iowa is covered by five area codes.  The map to the right is clickable, click on any of the area codes on the map to go to the area code for that region or use the text links below.

None of the Iowa codes are expected to need relief in the immediate future.

 319: Cedar Rapids, Waterloo, Iowa City, and Cedar Falls (original area code created in 1947)
 515: Des Moines, Ames, West Des Moines, Urbandale and Fort Dodge (original area code created in 1947)
 563: Davenport, Dubuque, Bettendorf, Clinton, Muscatine (split from 319 in 2001)
 641: Mason City, Marshalltown,  Ottumwa, Tama (split from 515 in 1997)
 712: Sioux City, Council Bluffs (original area code created in 1947)

See also
State of Iowa

 
Area codes
Iowa